Major General William Phillips Biddle (December 15, 1853 – February 24, 1923) was  the 11th Commandant of the United States Marine Corps.

Biography

Early life
William Phillip Biddle was born on December 15, 1853 in Philadelphia, Pennsylvania. His family was a part of the prominent Biddle family. He was educated in private schools in the Philadelphia area, by touring and at the University of Pennsylvania, where he joined the prestigious fraternity Delta Psi AKA St. Anthony Hall as did a number of Biddle family men.

Biddle was commissioned a second lieutenant in the Marine Corps on 22 June 1875 and after short tours of duty in Washington, D.C., New York City and Philadelphia, made the first of his many tours of sea duty on which he passed nearly half of his active service. He returned to Philadelphia for duty in February 1891, where he was promoted to captain in February 1894.

After war
Soon after the close of the war, Captain Biddle returned to Philadelphia for duty but was soon called to join the Fourth Battalion of Marines organized for duty in the Far East. With that battalion he arrived in China in time to take part in the US China Relief Expedition to Peking in 1900. After the affairs of the Boxer Rebellion had been somewhat adjusted, Capt. Biddle was transferred with his battalion to the First Brigade of Marines, Philippine Islands, where he served a little over two years, and then returned to the United States for duty at Headquarters. He was promoted to lieutenant colonel on 23 March 1903. He returned to the United States soon afterwards and served for short tours of duty in Philadelphia and at Headquarters, Marine Corps.

Biddle was promoted to colonel in February 1905 and during the following year, returned to the Philippine Islands where he commanded the First Brigade of Marines for about two years. He reported for duty at Headquarters in May 1908, and was soon afterwards detailed in Philadelphia and sent to Panama to reinforce the troops protecting the construction of the Panama Canal, and for potential duty in Nicaragua. He returned to Headquarters in April 1910, where he continued to serve the remainder of his active duty. During the closing months of Major General Elliott's commandancy, Colonel Biddle acted as Commandant most of the time.

Colonel Biddle was chosen as Major General Commandant of the Marine Corps on 3 February 1911. Colonel Biddle's tour of duty as Commandant was a comparatively quiet, short and uneventful one. He concerned himself primarily with the routine affairs of the Corps. Several minor expeditions took place, including the first intervention in Nicaragua. Under his administration, the Advance Base Force, forerunner of today's Fleet Marine Force, was also established in December 1913.

After nearly three years in office, Major General Commandant Biddle applied for retirement on the ground of having completed more than thirty years' service, and he was retired on 24 February 1914. He was recalled for active duty during the World War and served primarily on court-martial duty at San Diego, California.

Death
Major General Biddle died in Nice, France, on 24 February 1923 and was buried a month later in Arlington National Cemetery with full military honors.

Awards
Dewey Medal
Spanish Campaign Medal
Philippine Campaign Medal
Victory Medal

References

 
 
 
 

1853 births
1923 deaths
Burials at Arlington National Cemetery
Military personnel from Philadelphia
University of Pennsylvania alumni
United States Marine Corps generals
United States Marine Corps Commandants
American military personnel of the Boxer Rebellion
American military personnel of the Philippine–American War
American military personnel of the Spanish–American War
American military personnel of the Banana Wars
William P.
Cornell family